The Battle of the Century is a 1927 silent short film starring comedy double act Laurel and Hardy, who appeared in 107 films between 1921 and 1951. The film entered the public domain in the United States in 2023.

The film is famous for its use of more than 3,000 cream pies (although the Guinness Book of Records claims that as many as 10,000 may have been used) in the film's climactic pie fight. For many years, only three minutes from the film's second reel containing the pie fight was known to survive, as the footage had been included in Robert Youngson's 1950s film documentaries. However, the complete reel was rediscovered in 2015. It was released to the public on DVD and Blu-ray disc on June 16, 2020 as part of the Laurel & Hardy: The Definitive Restorations compilation of remastered films. Also in 2020, The Battle of the Century was selected for preservation in the United States National Film Registry by the Library of Congress as being "culturally, historically, or aesthetically significant."

Plot
A broke Hardy arranges for Laurel to fight Thunderclap Callahan in a boxing match for which the victor will receive $100. Fighting as Canvasback Clump, Laurel accidentally knocks out Callahan in the first round, but because Laurel will not return to his corner, the referee is unable to reach ten in his count. Callahan regains his senses and pummels Laurel. When Callahan delivers his final knockout blow, the audience leaves immediately before the referee can even begin his count.

In a nearby park, an insurance salesman persuades a despondent Hardy to invest the $5 that he received from the fight in an insurance policy on Laurel, but for Hardy to pocket the insurance money, Laurel must be injured. Hardy places a banana peel on a sidewalk and takes the unsuspecting Laurel there, but a pastry chef slips on it instead, becomes angry with Hardy and throws a pie in his face. Hardy responds, and soon the entire block is involved in an epic pie battle.

Production notes
Although The Battle of the Century is officially a Laurel and Hardy picture as they are jointly billed in the opening titles, the men had yet to fully display their recognizable characters. Their screen characters are not yet called Stan and Ollie; Laurel plays Canvasback Clump and Hardy's manager character is not named.

Laurel later said that because throwing a single pie would be a dreadful cliché, "Let’s give them so many pies that there never will be room for any more pie pictures in the whole history of the movies."

Early in the film, a young Lou Costello can be seen as a member of the prizefight crowd.

Lost film status
For many years, footage from the climactic pie fight was the only known surviving material from The Battle of the Century until the opening reel with the boxing match was discovered in 1979 by Richard Feiner. However, the sequence in the park involving Eugene Pallette as the insurance salesman was missing, as was the final gag in which a policeman receives a pie in his face and chases Laurel and Hardy down the street in the fadeout.

What is believed to be the entire film was once broadcast on Spanish television (station TVE1) during the 1970s, including scenes of a customer in a barber's chair receiving a pie in the face while being shaved and a man buying two pies to participate in the pie fight.

In June 2015, it was announced at the Mostly Lost film workshop in Culpeper, Virginia that the second reel of The Battle of the Century had been rediscovered by film collector Jon Mirsalis as a 16mm print from the original 35mm negative. The reel was found in the film collection of the late Gordon Berkow, who had acquired the collection of the late Robert Youngson, the writer and director of several Laurel and Hardy film compilations. Youngson had received the reel as a preview print while working on his 1957 film compilation The Golden Age of Comedy. The film was initially restored by Lobster Films, with subsequent restoration by Jeff Joseph in partnership with the UCLA Film Archive. The first official screening occurred at the Telluride Film Festival in September 2015, followed by a screening at the BFI London Film Festival in October 2015.

On April 8, 2017, the film was shown at the Toronto Silent Film Festival, with live accompaniment by Ben Model. On May 29, 2017, it was shown at the Southend Film Festival with live accompaniment by Adam Ramet. It was screened at the Mostly Lost film workshop in June 2016 on the one-year anniversary of the original announcement, with Mirsalis accompanying the film on piano.

Cast

 Stan Laurel - Canvasback Clump
 Oliver Hardy - Manager
 Noah Young - Thunderclap Callahan
 Eugene Pallette - Insurance agent
 Charlie Hall - Pie delivery man
 Sam Lufkin - Boxing referee
 Gene Morgan - Ring announcer
 Steve Murphy - Callahan's second
 George B. French - Dentist
 Dick Sutherland - Dental patient
 Anita Garvin - Woman who slips on pie
 Dick Gilbert - Sewer worker
 Wilson Benge - Pie victim with top hat
 Jack O'Brien - Shoeshine patron
 Ellinor Vanderveer - Lady in car
 Lyle Tayo - Woman at window
 Dorothy Coburn - Pie victim
 Al Hallett - Pie victim
 Lou Costello - Ringside spectator (extra)
 Jack Hill - Ringside spectator (extra)
 Ham Kinsey - Ringside spectator (extra)
 Ed Brandenburg - Warring pedestrian
 Bob O'Connor - Warring pedestrian
 Bert Roach
 Dorothea Wolbert
 Charley Young

See also
 List of incomplete or partially lost films
 List of rediscovered films
 Laurel and Hardy filmography

References

External links
 
 
 
 
 The Battle of the Century at SilentEra

1927 films
1927 comedy films
American silent short films
American boxing films
American black-and-white films
Laurel and Hardy (film series)
Metro-Goldwyn-Mayer short films
Films with screenplays by H. M. Walker
1920s rediscovered films
Rediscovered American films
United States National Film Registry films
Films directed by Clyde Bruckman
1920s American films
Silent American comedy films